Marion Thees (born Marion Trott on 5 July 1984 in Eisenach) is a German retired skeleton racer who has competed since 2001. She won two golds at the 2009 FIBT World Championships in Lake Placid, New York, earning them in the women's skeleton and mixed team events.

In 2009, Thees was second in the European Championships in St. Moritz. She won the Skeleton World Cup in 2008–09.

Thees qualified for the 2010 Winter Olympics where she finished eighth.

In September 2014 Thees announced via social media that she was retiring from competition and would be embarking on a career as a coach.

References

External links
  (2010 Winter Olympics)
  (2014 Winter Olympics)

1984 births
German female skeleton racers
Living people
Olympic skeleton racers of Germany
Skeleton racers at the 2010 Winter Olympics
Skeleton racers at the 2014 Winter Olympics
People from Eisenach
Sportspeople from Thuringia
20th-century German women
21st-century German women